Anatoliy Borysovych Abdula (Ukrainian: Анатолій Борисович Абдула, born 12 November 1976) is a Ukrainian professional football referee. He has been a full international for FIFA since 2012.

Honours
 Ukrainian Premier League best arbiter (3): 2011–12, 2015–16, 2016–17

References

External links
 Anatoliy Abdula at footballfacts.ru
 Anatoliy Abdula at allplayers.in.ua
 Ryzhenko, A. Hand of law. What need to know about the referee of the Shakhtar - Dynamo game (Рука закона. Что нужно знать про арбитра матча Шахтер - Динамо). UA-Football. 16 July 2016.
 
 
 

1976 births
Living people
Sportspeople from Kharkiv
Ukrainian football referees